The Protestant Reformed Church of Luxembourg (Luxembourgish: Protestantesch-Réforméiert Kierch vu Lëtzebuerg, French: Église Protestante Réformée du Luxembourg, German: Protestantisch-Reformierte Kirche von Luxemburg) is a Protestant Reformed denomination that operates solely in Luxembourg.

Established in 1982 by decree of Grand Duke Jean, it is one of the six state-supported denominations in Luxembourg.
It has about 100 members in 1 church.
Member of World Communion of Reformed Churches and of the Reformed Alliance. Ordination of women and blessings of same-sex marriages are allowed.

External links 
 Church website

See also 
Religion in Luxembourg

References 

Reformed
Luxembourg Reformed
Christian organizations established in 1982
1982 establishments in Luxembourg